Glow in the Dark is a live album released by Roger Clyne and the Peacemakers. It was recorded live in Teaneck, NJ and released on February 2, 2009, and is only available in digital format via the band's website.

Track listing
"Contraband "
"Maybe We Should Fall in Love"
"I Know You Know"
"Mexico/Lemons"
"Down Together"
"Your Name on a Grain of Rice"
"Mercy"
"Sin Nombre"
"Leave an Open Door"
"I Can Drink the Water"
"Hello New Day"
"Mañana"
"European Swallow"
"I Do"

2009 albums
Roger Clyne and the Peacemakers albums